Daryl Jones may refer to:

 Daryl Jones (politician) (born 1955), politician from Miami, Florida, United States
 Daryl Jones (baseball) (born 1987), American baseball outfielder
 Daryl Jones (American football) (born 1979), former American football wide receiver

See also 
 Darryl Jones (disambiguation)